Oliver James Hannon-Dalby (born 20 June 1989) is an English cricketer, currently with Warwickshire having previously played for Yorkshire County Cricket Club. He is a left-handed batsman and a right arm medium-fast bowler.

Hannon-Dalby was a graduate of the Yorkshire Cricket Academy. He made his first-class debut against Surrey on 21 May 2008, where his first wicket was that of prolific runscorer Mark Ramprakash.

He gained his first five-wicket haul of 5 for 68 against Warwickshire in the first match of the 2010 County Championship season. He followed this up in the second match with another haul, coincidentally also 5 for 68, against Somerset at Headingley.

References

External links
 
 Oliver Hannon-Dalby at Warwickshire County Cricket Club

1989 births
Living people
Yorkshire cricketers
Cricketers from Halifax, West Yorkshire
English cricketers
Warwickshire cricketers
Marylebone Cricket Club cricketers